The SoundDroid is an early digital audio workstation designed by a team of engineers led by James A. Moorer at Lucasfilm between 1980 and 1987. It was a hard-disk–based, nonlinear audio editor developed on the Audio Signal Processor (ASP), a large-scale digital signal processor for real-time, multichannel equalization and audio mixing.

History
Lucasfilm started putting together a computer division right after Star Wars as an in-house project to build a range of digital tools for filmmaking. The audio project that became SoundDroid was done in close collaboration with the post-production division, Sprocket Systems, and later spun out as part of a joint venture called The Droid Works.  

Only one SoundDroid prototype was ever built and it was never commercialized. 

EditDroid and SoundDroid were the beginnings of the desktop tools digital revolution.

Sonic Solutions, developed the NoNoise product from SoundDroid.

Capabilities
Complete with a trackball, touch-sensitive displays, moving faders, and a jog-shuttle wheel, the SoundDroid included programs for sound synthesis, digital reverberation, recording, editing and mixing.

References
 .
 
 
 .

Digital audio workstation software
Digital signal processing
Lucasfilm